The Log Cabin Republicans (LCR) is an organization within the Republican Party which advocates for equal rights for LGBT+ Americans.

History
Log Cabin Republicans was founded in 1977 in California as a rallying point for Republicans opposed to the Briggs Initiative, which attempted to ban homosexuals from teaching in public schools. In addition to sanctioning the termination of openly gay and lesbian teachers, the proposed legislation authorized the firing of those teachers who publicly "supported" homosexuality.

While mounting his imminent presidential campaign, Ronald Reagan publicly expressed his opposition to the discriminatory policy. Reagan's condemnation of the bill—epitomized in a letter sent to a pro-Briggs group, excerpts of which were re-printed in the San Francisco Chronicle in 1978—played an influential role in the eventual defeat of the Briggs Initiative.

In the midst of this victory, gay conservatives in California created the Log Cabin Republicans. The group initially proposed to name themselves Lincoln Club, but found that name was already in use by the Lincoln Club of Orange County, another California Republican organization, so the name Log Cabin Republicans was chosen as an alternative title. This designation calls attention to the first Republican president, Abraham Lincoln. The Log Cabin Republicans suggest that Lincoln founded the Republican Party on the philosophies of liberty and equality.  These principles, Log Cabin argues, are consistent with their platform of an inclusive Republican Party.

1992 presidential election
The 1992 Log Cabin Republican convention was held in Spring, Texas, a Houston exurb.  The main point of discussion was whether or not LCR would endorse the re-election of President George H. W. Bush. The group voted to deny that endorsement because Bush did not denounce anti-gay rhetoric at the 1992 Republican National Convention.

1996 presidential election
In August 1995, the campaign of Republican presidential candidate, Bob Dole, returned the LCR's $1,000 campaign contribution. The campaign returned the contribution after the openly lesbian columnist, Deb Price, of the Detroit News, asked about it after she saw it on a public report from the Federal Elections Commission.  The campaign sent a written statement to Price saying that Dole was in "100% disagreement with the agenda of the Log Cabin Republicans." The finance office of the campaign had solicited the contribution from LCR. At the event where it was given, Dole had personally spoken with LCR's then-executive director, Rich Tafel, about the group and about AIDS legislation it was promoting in the Senate. Weeks earlier, Dole agreed to co-sponsor the legislation after a meeting with Tafel at the campaign's headquarters.  It resulted in a front-page story in The New York Times, penned by Richard L. Berke, then-chief political reporter for the daily.

As reporters, including Berke, were seeking confirmation of the story before it broke, Dole's finance chairman, John Moran, asked Tafel not to speak to the press and that Tafel's "steadfastness and statesmanship at this moment will be handsomely appreciated in the long run by the campaign."  Tafel refused.

Pundits accused Dole of being a "flip-flopper and a hypocrite."  Editorials ran in major newspapers, including The Washington Post, The New York Times, The Boston Globe, the Atlanta Journal-Constitution, and The Times of London, condemning Dole's action, joined by radio commentators Rush Limbaugh and Don Imus.  Under the pressure, Dole admitted during an October 1995 press briefing on Capitol Hill that he regretted the decision to return the check, and that his campaign was responsible for it without consulting him.  "I think if they'd have consulted me, we wouldn't have done that, wouldn't have returned it," Dole said. Dole later told Washington Post editor and author Bob Woodward that the LCR episode was a "mistake" because the decision to return the check "gets into Bob Dole the person.  It's not so much about Bob Dole the candidate. It's the person.  Is he tolerant?  Does he tolerate different views?  Tolerate someone with a different lifestyle?"  He added, "This is basic, this is what people ought to know about you.  Are you going to just do this because it sounds good politically?"

LCR's leadership met with Dole's coalitions manager to discuss an endorsement after Dole's reversal.  Among various items, Tafel demanded there be no gay bashing in the speeches from the podium of the 1996 Republican National Convention, nor any anti-homosexual signs on the convention floor.  He also wanted to see a gay person address the convention and a public request from Dole's campaign for the LCR nod. On the closing night of the convention, Stephen Fong, then-president of the San Francisco chapter, spoke at the dais as part of a series of speeches from "mainstreet Americans," but was not publicly identified as gay. Nevertheless, his presence on the podium for the organization and for the gay and lesbian community "was something that would have been unimaginable four years earlier," Tafel later wrote. Fong was the first openly gay speaker at a Republican National Convention.

Two days later, Dole spokesperson Christina Martin told a reporter that the campaign "welcomed the endorsement of the Log Cabin Republicans."  LCR voted to endorse Dole for President, and then-Republican National Committee chairman Haley Barbour approved the use of the RNC's press briefing room for Tafel, LCR's convention delegates and officers of its national board to announce their decision.

Later in the campaign, Tafel met with Dole's chief aide Sheila Burke, and the remaining demands LCR made for their endorsement were met.  In a statement released by LCR, and confirmed to reporters by the campaign, Dole had pledged to maintain an executive order prohibiting discrimination based on sexual orientation in the federal workforce and full funding for AIDS programs.

2000 presidential election
The group endorsed George W. Bush in 2000.

2004 presidential election
Due to his support of the Federal Marriage Amendment, the group declined to endorse the reelection of George W. Bush in 2004. The proposed amendment would have constitutionally defined marriage as exclusively between one man and one woman. Bush's defense of the FMA led the group to vote 22 to 2 against an endorsement of his reelection. The Palm Beach County chapter in Florida did endorse him, resulting in the revocation of their charter.

2008 presidential election
In September 2008, LCR voted to endorse the John McCain–Sarah Palin ticket in the 2008 presidential election. LCR President Patrick Sammon said the most important reason for their support was McCain's opposition to the proposed constitutional amendment to ban same-sex marriage.

2012 presidential election
On 23 October 2012, LCR officially endorsed Mitt Romney despite Romney's commitment to a constitutional amendment barring gays and lesbians from marriage nationwide and his objection to the repeal of the "Don't Ask, Don't Tell" policy on military service. In a public statement, LCR said it supported Romney due to the "gravity of the economic and national security issues currently at stake". Moreover, LCR expressed its hope that Romney would reconsider his opposition to the Employment Non-Discrimination Act, but he did not.

2016 presidential election
On October 22, 2016, the board members of LCR voted not to endorse the Republican nominee for president, Donald Trump. In defiance, the LCR statewide chapters of Colorado, Georgia, and Texas, along with the LCR countywide chapter of Orange County, California and the LCR city chapters of Houston, Texas; Los Angeles, California; Miami, Florida; and Cleveland, Ohio; voted to endorse Donald Trump.

Nationwide, exit polls estimated that Trump received the lowest percentage of the LGBT vote by any Republican presidential candidate since the metric was first included in Presidential polls in 1992. Trump received only 14% of the LGBT vote, a significant decline from Mitt Romney who received 22% in 2012.

On November 9, 2016, the national LCR congratulated Donald Trump on his victory.

2020 presidential endorsement

In November 2018, Jerri Ann Henry became the first woman to serve as Log Cabin executive director. A month later, she said in a television interview that, while she perceived Trump as having been "vocally supportive" of LGBT people compared to other Republican presidents and presidential candidates, nevertheless there had been "a lot of ups and downs in the last two years with some of the administration's actions."

Despite the reservations of their executive director, the Log Cabins endorsed Trump over a year in advance of the election. On August 16, 2019, chair Robert Kabel and vice chair Jill Homan gave their reasons for the endorsement in a Washington Post op-ed. Jennifer Horn (who earlier in the year had served as campaign manager for Bill Weld, who challenged Trump in the 2020 primary) resigned in protest from the Log Cabin board, as did Sarah Longwell, the first female member of Log Cabin's board. Jerri Ann Henry left her position as executive director 10 days after the op-ed was published.

Log Cabin Republicans v. United States

A lawsuit filed by LCR in federal court challenging the "Don't Ask, Don't Tell" (DADT) policy, which excluded homosexuals from openly serving in the U.S. military, went to trial on July 13, 2010, presided by Judge Virginia Phillips. LCR argued that the policy violates the rights of homosexual military members to free speech, due process and open association. The government argued that DADT was necessary to advance a legitimate governmental interest. LCR introduced several admissions by President Barack Obama, including that DADT "doesn't contribute to our national security," "weakens our national security," and that reversing DADT is "essential for our national security". Rather than address plaintiff's claims or bring evidence to support their own claims of national interest, the government relied exclusively on the policy's 1993 legislative history.

On September 9, 2010, Phillips ruled in favor of plaintiffs, finding that DADT violates the First and Fifth Amendments to the United States Constitution.

On September 29, 2011, the United States Court of Appeals for the Ninth Circuit vacated the district court's decision, ruling that the legislative repeal of "don't ask, don't tell" by President Barack Obama and the outgoing Democratic congressional majority in December 2010 rendered the case moot. The dismissal left the lower court ruling without value as precedent.

Platform
LCR acts under the statement: "We are loyal Republicans. We believe in limited government, strong national defense, free markets, low taxes, personal responsibility, and individual liberty. Log Cabin Republicans represents an important part of the American family—taxpaying, hard working people who proudly believe in this nation's greatness. We also believe all Americans have the right to liberty and equality. We believe equality for LGBT Americans is in the finest tradition of the Republican Party. We educate our Party about why inclusion wins. Opposing gay and lesbian equality is inconsistent with the GOP's core principles of smaller government and personal freedom."

On social issues, LCR either dissents from social conservatism or is neutral. On matters relating to gay and lesbian rights, LCR advocates for same-sex marriage and tax equity for domestic partner benefits. The LCR website also contains an 'Equality Map' giving information on state laws in areas from employment discrimination and relationship recognition to hate crimes protections and anti-bullying laws.

LCR takes no official position on abortion.

On the issue of national defense: "Log Cabin Republicans believe in a confident foreign policy and a strong national defense.  As the world's sole military superpower, it is vital that the United States remain ready and able to shoulder its responsibilities in the global arena while standing as a beacon of freedom.  Log Cabin Republicans call attention to the cruel and abusive treatment of gays and lesbians worldwide, particularly as it coincides with authoritarian regimes renowned for supporting terrorism and disregarding other basic human rights."

Membership

Chapters
Since 1977, LCR has expanded across the United States and has 35 chapters, representing 26 states and the District of Columbia:

 Arizona 
 Arkansas 
 California
 Los Angeles 
 Marin County 
 Orange County 
 Palm Springs 
 Sacramento 
 San Diego 
 San Francisco 
 Sequoias 
 Silicon Valley 
 UCB / Alameda County 
 Ventura County
 Colorado 
 Delaware
 District of Columbia 
 Florida 
 Broward 
 Miami 
 Northeast / Jacksonville
 Tampa Bay 
 Central / Orlando 
 Georgia 
 Illinois
 Iowa 
 Louisiana 
 Maryland 
 Massachusetts 
 Michigan 
 Minnesota 
 Nevada 
 New Hampshire
 New York
 Hudson Valley 
 New York City 
 North Carolina 
 Ohio 
 Cleveland 
 Northeast Ohio 
 Oklahoma 
 Oregon 
 Pennsylvania 
 Rhode Island
 South Carolina 
 Texas 
 Austin 
 Dallas 
 Houston 
 San Antonio 
 Fort Worth 
 Utah 
 Virginia 
 Northern Virginia 
 Richmond
 Washington 
 Wisconsin (Chapter has been dissolved as of March 2022)

Criticism
LCR has been criticized for failing to promote Republican principles. Focusing on "the battle for gay and lesbian civil rights" at its March–April 2005 convention and Liberty Education Forum National Symposium, panel topics included "Corporate Diversity"; "Family Fairness"; and "Is Sexual Orientation a Choice?"  This caused two Washington Post opinion columnists to say that "the Log Cabin Republicans are looking less and less Republican."

In 2012, the Log Cabin Republicans were criticized by advocates of gay rights and marriage equality for endorsing Republican candidates who advocated new limitations on the legal rights of gay Americans as well as the retention of current discriminatory laws and policies.

Some in the LGBT community have expressed dissatisfaction with LCR, viewing it as a centrist organization that does not represent LGBT economic conservatives. In 2009, two former LCR members, Christopher R. Barron and Jimmy LaSalvia, formed GOProud to represent LGBT economic conservatives and libertarians; it was dissolved in 2014.

LCR president Greg Angelo described the "preservation of LGBT rights and support for the LGBT community" as hallmarks of Donald Trump's 2016 Presidential campaign, and asserted that support would continue during his presidency. On that same day as these comments were made, the New York Times reported that the Trump administration had rescinded Obama-era guidance on transgender students' rights. David Badash, editor-in-chief and founder of the New Civil Rights Movement has criticized LCR for not opposing this action.  In 2017, Angelo described Trump as "the most pro-LGBT Republican president in history." In a February 2018 interview, he said that Trump recognizes marriage equality as the "settled law of the land, sent a letter of congratulations and commemoration [on Log Cabin's 40th anniversary], and has people in his Cabinet who support marriage equality." Angelo therefore concluded that "Trump is even better for the LGBTQ community than former President Barack Obama," despite other evidence to the contrary.

LCR’s decision to hire Isabella Riley Moody as an “outspoken ambassador” for the group was questioned due to Moody’s blatantly homophobic rhetoric, her own statement that the LCR’s statement of principles “really just grosses me out and makes me want to vomit”, and her claim that she only signed on in order to “troll the left”.

See also

 DeploraBall
 Deplorable Pride
 Gay Conservatives
 Gay Republicans (2004 film)
 Gays for Trump
 GOProud
 LGBT+ Conservatives, a similar organization affiliated with the British Conservative Party
 LGBTory, a similar organization affiliated with the Conservative Party of Canada

References
Notes

Bibliography
 Tafel, Richard (1999) Party Crasher, New York: Simon & Schuster.  
 Woodward, Bob (1996) The Choice, New York: Simon & Schuster.

External links
 Log Cabin Republican homepage

1977 establishments in Washington, D.C.
Factions in the Republican Party (United States)
LGBT affiliate organizations of political parties
LGBT conservatism in the United States
LGBT political advocacy groups in the United States
LGBT political advocacy groups in Washington, D.C.
Organizations established in 1977
Republican Party (United States) organizations